Strathcona Girls Grammar School is an independent, Baptist, day school for girls, located in Canterbury, an inner-eastern suburb of Melbourne, Victoria, Australia.

Established in 1924 by Florence Livingstone and Henrietta Hughes, the school currently caters for approximately 800 students from Preparatory to Year 12, over three campuses. Year nine girls attend 'Tay Creggan', a historic building on the Yarra River in Hawthorn. Years 7 to 12 are located in Canterbury, and the primary school is located on a new purpose-built premises in close proximity to the Main Campus in Canterbury.

The school is affiliated with the Junior School Heads Association of Australia (JSHAA), the Association of Heads of Independent Schools of Australia (AHISA), the Association of Independent Schools of Victoria (AISV), the Alliance of Girls' Schools Australasia (AGSA), and is a founding member of Girls Sport Victoria (GSV).

History
Strathcona was established in 1924 by its founding principals, Florence Livingstone and Henrietta Hughes, with a small number of pupils, both boys and girls.

In 1942, the school was purchased by the Baptist Union for the purpose of establishing a Baptist school for girls, and thus the school was renamed Strathcona Baptist Girls Grammar School.

Ms Featherstone commenced as headmistress in 1943, serving the school for 10 years. Enrolments increased rapidly and despite strict building restrictions after the Second World War, facilities were expanded providing for up to 200 girls.

In November 1969, Strathcona purchased 'Tay Creggan', the Year 9 campus located in Hawthorn on the banks of the Yarra River.

Principals
There have been a total of nine principles or formerly headmistresses of Strathcona since the school was established in 1924. Note, between 1924 and 1941 there were two headmistresses at the same time who were the co-founders of the school.

Curriculum 
Strathcona Baptist Girls’ Grammar School offers the Victorian Certificate of Education (VCE) for their Year 11 and 12 students.

Sport 
Strathcona is a member of Girls Sport Victoria (GSV).

GSV premierships 
Strathcona has won the following GSV premiership.

 Tennis - 2004

Notable alumnae
Alumnae of Strathcona are known as Old Strathconians and are part of the school's alumni association, the Old Strathconians' Association (OSA). Some notable Old Strathconians include:

Jill Baker – Publisher and former newspaper editor
Pamela Christine Gutman – Author; Member of the Refugee Review Tribunal; deputy director of the Research Institute for Asia and the Pacific at the University of Sydney; Senior Advisor for the Foreign Affairs Department
Margaret Anne Jackson – professor and Director, Law Discipline, School of Accounting and Law, RMIT Business, RMIT University
 Regan Lamble – Australian representative to the 2012 Olympics in Athletics and selected for the 2016 Rio Olympic Team for the 20 km Race Walk.
Norma Redpath OBE – Sculptor
Prudence Anne Sibree – Parliamentarian and Solicitor; Member for Kew in the Legislative Assembly in the Victorian Parliament from 1981 to 1988.
Jo Stanley – TV and Radio personality
Jess Wilson - Current state MP for the Kew District

See also 
 List of schools in Victoria
 Victorian Certificate of Education

References

External links 
 Strathcona Baptist Girls Grammar School Website
 Girls Sport Victoria

Girls' schools in Victoria (Australia)
Educational institutions established in 1924
Private schools in Melbourne
Baptist schools in Australia
Junior School Heads Association of Australia Member Schools
1924 establishments in Australia
Alliance of Girls' Schools Australasia
Buildings and structures in the City of Boroondara